Blaine Allison Brownell (born November 12, 1942) is an American university teacher, administrator, and specialist in U.S. urban, southern, and twentieth-century history, and was the 12th president of Ball State University. Author or co-author of seven books and over twenty-five articles, he has been a tenured full professor at four universities.

Education
Blaine Brownell received his early education in the Birmingham, Alabama city school system, and graduated from Ramsay High School. He earned his B.A. degree from Washington and Lee University in Lexington, Virginia and his M.A. and Ph.D. degrees in United States history from the University of North Carolina at Chapel Hill.

Academic career

During 1971–72 Brownell was a senior research fellow at the Institute of Southern History at Johns Hopkins University.  He co-founded the Journal of Urban History and was editor from 1976 to 1990. He was department chair, graduate dean, and dean of social and behavioral sciences at the University of Alabama at Birmingham (1974–1990), provost and vice president for academic affairs at the University of North Texas in Denton (1990–1998), and executive director of international programs at the University of Memphis (1998–2000).

International work
A lifelong interest in international education began with his appointment as the Fulbright Lecturer at Hiroshima University, Japan (1977–78) and continued in a visiting professorship at Sichuan University in China (1987) and appointment as academic specialist for the U.S. Information Agency in Brazil.  He also was editor of the International Education Forum (1998–2000) and for over a decade as member and chair of the board of directors of the International Student Exchange Programs in Washington, D.C.

Ball State University
In 2000, Brownell succeeded John E. Worthen as president of Ball State University in Muncie, Indiana. He also accepted a tenured appointment as Professor of History and Urban Planning.

Later career
In 2004 he was appointed the first president and CEO of U21 Pedagogica, the academic quality assurance arm of Universitas 21, the U21 global academic consortium of seventeen major research universities, headquartered at the University of Virginia.  Subsequently, he was interim dean of business, senior advisor for strategic planning and international programs, and interim provost at the University of South Florida St. Petersburg, and for several years as consultant and advisor to the national universities of the United Arab Emirates for the Minister for Higher Education and Research.

He is now retired and living in Charlottesville, Virginia.

Works

 The Urban Ethos in the South, 1920-1930, 1975. 
 Urban America: From Downtown to No Town, 1979. 
 The Urban Nation, 1920-1980, 1981. 
 Using Microcomputers, 1985. 
 Washington and Lee University, 1930-2000: Tradition and Transformation, 2017.

See also
 List of Ball State University Presidents

References

1943 births
Living people
Washington and Lee University alumni
University of North Carolina at Chapel Hill alumni
University of Memphis faculty
University of North Texas faculty
University of Alabama at Birmingham faculty
Purdue University faculty
Presidents of Ball State University
Ramsay High School alumni